Barlowe's Guide to Extraterrestrials (1979; second edition 1987) is a science fiction book by artist Wayne Barlowe, with Ian Summers and Beth Meacham (who provided the text). It contains Barlowe's visualizations of different extraterrestrial life forms from various works of science fiction, with information on their planetary location or range, biology, and behaviors, in the style of a real field guide for animals. It was nominated for an American Book Award and for the 1980 Hugo Award for Best Related Work.

The second edition has an added foreword by Robert Silverberg.

After the success of the work, in 1996 Barlowe and Neil Duskis wrote a second book, Barlowe's Guide to Fantasy.

Summary
The book contains descriptions of the following species:

Abyormenite - Hal Clement's Cycle of Fire (1957)
Athshean - Ursula K. Le Guin's The Word for World Is Forest (1975)
Black Cloud - Fred Hoyle's The Black Cloud (1957)
Chulpex - Avram Davidson's Masters of the Maze (1965)
Cinruss - James White's Sector General series (1957-)
Cryer - Joseph Green's Conscience Interplanetary (1972)
Cygnan - Donald Moffitt's The Jupiter Theft (1977)
Cygnostik - Michael Bishop's A Little Knowledge (1977)
Czill - Jack L. Chalker's Well World series (1977)
Demon - Keith Laumer's A Plague of Demons (1977)
Demu - F. M. Busby's Cage a Man (1973)
Dextran - David J. Lake's The Right Hand of Dextra (1977)
Dilbian - Gordon R. Dickson's  Delivery and Spacepaw (1961) 
Dirdir - Jack Vance's Planet of Adventure series (1968)
Garnishee - Harry Harrison's Star Smashers of the Galaxy Rangers (1973)
Gowachin - Frank Herbert's The Dosadi Experiment (1977)
Guild Steersman - Frank Herbert's Dune 
Ishtarians - Poul Anderson's Fire Time (1974)
Ixchel - Madeleine L'Engle's A Wrinkle in Time
Ixtl - A. E. van Vogt's The Voyage of the Space Beagle
Lithian - James Blish's A Case of Conscience
Masters - John Christopher's The Tripods trilogy
Medusan - Jack Williamson's The Legion of Space
Merseian - Poul Anderson's Ensign Flandry
Mesklinite - Hal Clement's Mission of Gravity
Mother - Philip José Farmer's Strange Relations
Old Galactic - James H. Schmitz's Legacy
Old One - H. P. Lovecraft's At the Mountains of Madness
Overlord - Arthur C. Clarke's Childhood's End
Pnume - Jack Vance's Planet of Adventure series
Polarian - Piers Anthony's Cluster series
Pierson's Puppeteers - Larry Niven's Known Space series
Radiate - Naomi Mitchison's Memoirs of a Spacewoman
Regul - C. J. Cherryh's The Faded Sun: Kesrith
Riim - A. E. van Vogt's The Voyage of the Space Beagle
Ruml - Gordon R. Dickson's The Alien Way
Salaman - Brian Stableford's Wildeblood's Empire
 Sirian - Frederik Pohl's The Age of the Pussyfoot
Slash - Piers Anthony's Kirlian Quest
Soft One - Isaac Asimov's The Gods Themselves
Solaris - Stanisław Lem's Solaris
Sulidor - Robert Silverberg's Downward to the Earth (alternately spelled 'Sulidoror' by both Barlowe and Silverberg)
Terran - humans; no specific novel - an image of a human (the author) used in the size comparison chart in the book.
The Thing - John W. Campbell's Who Goes There?
Thrint - Larry Niven's Known Space series
Tran - Alan Dean Foster's Icerigger
Triped - Damon Knight's Rule Golden
Tyreean - James Tiptree's Up the Walls of the World
Uchjinian - Jack L. Chalker's Well World series  (1977)
Vegan - Robert A. Heinlein's Have Space Suit—Will Travel
Velantian - E. E. Smith's Lensman series

Reception
Barlowe's Guide to Extraterrestrials received a mixed review from Wendy Bousfield in Library Journal. Bousfield commented that the book's drawings were "colorful", but also "somewhat static and artificial-looking, with less vitality than the preparatory sketches from the artist's notebook included at the end." She also criticized the omission of "the facts of publication of the novels", but concluded that public libraries might still be interested in the work. The book received a positive review from Claudia J. Morner in School Library Journal. Morner praised the book's "colorful drawings" and "fold-out comparative size chart" showing the size of aliens relative to human beings. She concluded that it was a "fun browsing book" that would appeal to "young people fascinated by monsters" as well as to science fiction readers.

Barlowe's work was nominated for an American Book Award and for the 1980 Hugo Award for Best Related Work.

References

External links
 
 

1979 books
Books about extraterrestrial life
Books by Wayne Barlowe
Encyclopedias of fictional worlds
English-language books
Science fiction books
Workman Publishing Company books